Conrad Anton Olsson Brunkman (20 January 1887 – 27 May 1925), also spelled Konrad, was a Swedish rower who competed in the 1912 Summer Olympics. He won a silver medal in the coxed four, inriggers, and failed to reach the finals of the eight tournament. His younger brother Gustaf competed alongside in the men's eight.

References

1887 births
1925 deaths
Swedish male rowers
Olympic rowers of Sweden
Rowers at the 1912 Summer Olympics
Olympic silver medalists for Sweden
Olympic medalists in rowing
Medalists at the 1912 Summer Olympics
Sportspeople from Helsingborg